Beyan (also Romanized as Beyān and Bayān; also known as Baigun, Qal‘eh Beig, Qal‘eh-ye Beyg, and Qal‘eh-ye Beyk) is a village in Shahidabad Rural District, Mashhad-e Morghab District, Khorrambid County, Fars Province, Iran. At the 2006 census, its population was 66, in 23 families.

References 

Populated places in Khorrambid County